James Strauch (September 30, 1921 – November 30, 1998) was an American Olympic fencer.

Early and personal life
Strauch was born in New York, New York, and was Jewish. He attended City College of New York (CCNY) for college, and graduated in 1942 with a degree in business administration. He later went to  graduate school at Georgetown University, and became a certified public accountant (CPA). He worked as a senior accountant at H. L. Green.

Fencing career
Strauch represented Salle Montague of New York and the Fencers Club of New York.  In college, he fenced for CCNY.

He was the US Epee Champion in 1947. Strauch also competed in the team épée event at the 1952 Summer Olympics.

See also
 List of USFA Division I National Champions

References

External links
 

1921 births
1998 deaths
American male sabre fencers
Olympic fencers of the United States
Fencers at the 1952 Summer Olympics
Sportspeople from New York City
Jewish male sabre fencers
Jewish American sportspeople
City College of New York alumni
CCNY Beavers fencers
Georgetown University alumni
American accountants
20th-century American Jews